Let the Picture Paint Itself is an album by the American musician Rodney Crowell, released in 1994 by MCA Records. His first release for that label, it failed to chart on the Billboard Top Country Albums chart. The songs "Let the Picture Paint Itself", "Big Heart" and "I Don't Fall in Love So Easy" were released as singles but did not chart successfully.

Critical reception

Entertainment Weekly wrote: "With the country scene overcrowded with Stetson-wearing cartoon figures, Picture is refreshing for its honesty and intelligence, a glorious example of a master returning to form."

Track listing
All songs composed by Rodney Crowell except when noted
"Let the Picture Paint Itself" - 4:07
"Give My Heart a Rest" - 3:32
"Stuff That Works" (Guy Clark, Crowell) - 4:03
"Big Heart" - 3:40
"Loving You Makes Me Strong" - 3:42
"The Best Years of Our Lives" - 2:40
"I Don't Fall in Love So Easy" - 3:49
"That Ol' Door" - 4:30
"The Rose of Memphis" (Clark, Crowell) - 3:39
"Once in a While" (Crowell, John Leventhal) - 4:10

Personnel
Eddie Bayers - drums
Jim Cox - organ, synthesizer, piano
Rodney Crowell - vocals, acoustic guitar, electric guitar
Stuart Duncan - fiddle
Paul Franklin - Dobro, guitar, steel guitar
Bob Glaub - bass guitar
Dann Huff - electric guitar
Patty Loveless - background and harmony vocals
Liana Manis - background and harmony vocals
Brent Mason - acoustic guitar, electric guitar
Steve Nathan - organ, synthesizer, piano
Herb Pedersen - background vocals
Brent Rowan - electric guitar
Billy Stanford - electric guitar
Harry Stinson - background vocals
Glenn Worf - bass guitar
Trisha Yearwood - background and harmony vocals

Singles

References

1994 albums
Rodney Crowell albums
Albums produced by Tony Brown (record producer)
MCA Records albums
Albums produced by Rodney Crowell